The Ulot River is the longest river in Samar, the third largest island in the Philippines. The river runs from San Jose de Buan in the Samar Province and discharges into the Philippine Sea. It has a length of approximately 90 km.

References

Rivers of the Philippines
Samar Island Natural Park
Landforms of Samar (province)
Landforms of Eastern Samar